The Auguste Piccard mesoscaphe, also known simply as the Mésoscaphe, was a manned underwater submarine designed in 1964 by Jacques Piccard, son of Auguste Piccard. It was the world's first passenger submarine, built for Expo64, the 1964 Swiss national exhibition in Lausanne. It was built at the Giovanola fabrication plant in Monthey and the first immersion took place in Le Bouveret on 27 February 1964. It has a total of 45 Plexiglas portholes, with 20 on each side for the 40 passengers.

The Auguste Piccard achieved 1,100 dives in Lake Geneva with 33,000 visitors in 1964 and 1965, to a depth of approximately 150 metres. The ride cost CHF 40 and was the hit of the national exhibition. From 1969 to 1984, it achieved scientific and industrial observation dives in the Gulf of Mexico.

The ship is currently on display at the Swiss Museum of Transport in Lucerne. It was fully restored for the first time between 2005 and 2014, the restoration taking 28,000 hours.

References
 Dead links here

External links

Research submarines of Switzerland
1964 ships
Lake Geneva
Merchant ships of Switzerland
Submarines of Switzerland
Ships built in Switzerland
Museum ships